The University of Louisville (UofL) is a public research university in Louisville, Kentucky. It is part of the Kentucky state university system. When founded in 1798, it was the first city-owned public university in the United States and one of the first universities chartered west of the Allegheny Mountains. The university is mandated by the Kentucky General Assembly to be a "Preeminent Metropolitan Research University". It enrolls students from 118 of 120 Kentucky counties, all 50 U.S. states, and 116 countries around the world.

Louisville is classified among "R1: Doctoral Universities – Very high research activity". The University of Louisville School of Medicine is touted for the first fully self-contained artificial heart transplant surgery, as well as the first successful hand transplantation in the United States. The University Hospital is also credited with the first civilian ambulance, the nation's first accident services, now known as an emergency department (ED), and one of the first blood banks in the US.

University of Louisville is known for the Louisville Cardinals athletics programs. Since 2005, the Cardinals have made appearances in the NCAA Division I men's basketball Final Four in 2005, 2012, and 2013 (vacated), football Bowl Championship Series Orange Bowl in 2007 (champions) and Sugar Bowl in 2013 (champions), the College Baseball World Series 2007, 2013, 2014, 2017 and 2019, the women's basketball Final Four in 2009 (runner-up), 2013 (runner-up), and 2018, and the men's soccer national championship game in 2010. The Louisville Cardinals Women's Volleyball program has three-peated as champions of the Big East Tournament (2008, 2009, 2010), and were Atlantic Coast Conference Champions in 2015 and 2017. Women's track and field program has won Outdoor Big East titles in 2008, 2009 and 2010 and an Indoor Big East title in 2011.

History

Founding and early years: 1798–1845

The University of Louisville traces its roots to a charter granted in 1798 by the Kentucky General Assembly to establish a school of higher learning in the newly founded town of Louisville. It ordered the sale of 6,000 acres (24 km2) of South Central Kentucky land to underwrite construction, joined on April 3, 1798, by eight community leaders who began local fund raising for what was then known as the Jefferson Seminary. It opened 15 years later and offered college and high school level courses in a variety of subjects. It was headed by Edward Mann Butler from 1813 to 1816, who later ran the first public school in Kentucky in 1829 and is considered Kentucky's first historian.

Despite the Jefferson Seminary's early success, pressure from newly established public schools and media critiques of it as "elitist" would force its closure in 1829.

Eight years later, in 1837, the Louisville City council established the Louisville Medical Institute at the urging of renowned physician and medical author Charles Caldwell. As he had earlier at Lexington's Transylvania University, Caldwell rapidly led LMI into becoming one of the leading medical schools west of the Allegheny Mountains. In 1840, the Louisville Collegiate institute, a rival medical school, was established after an LMI faculty dispute. It opened in 1844 on land near the present day Health sciences campus.

As a public municipal university: 1846–1969
In 1846, the Kentucky legislature combined the Louisville Medical Institute, the Louisville Collegiate Institution, and a newly created law school into the University of Louisville, on a campus just east of Downtown Louisville. The LCI folded soon afterwards. The university experienced rapid growth in the 20th century, adding new schools in the liberal arts (1907), graduate studies (1915), dentistry (1918), engineering (1925), music (1932) and social work (1936).

In 1923, the school purchased what is today the Belknap Campus, where it moved its liberal arts programs and law school, with the medical school remaining downtown. The school had attempted to purchase a campus donated by the Belknap family in The Highlands area in 1917 (where Bellarmine University is currently located), but a citywide tax increase to pay for it was voted down. The Belknap Campus was named after the family for their efforts. In 1926, the building that would later be dedicated as Grawemeyer Hall, was built.

In 1931, the university established the Louisville Municipal College for Negroes on the former campus of Simmons University (now Simmons College of Kentucky), as a compromise plan to desegregation. As a part of the university, the school had an equal standing with the school's other colleges. It was dissolved in 1951 when the university desegregated.

During World War II, Louisville was one of 131 colleges and universities nationally that took part in the V-12 Navy College Training Program which offered students a path to a Navy commission.

In the second half of the 20th century, schools were opened for business (1953), education (1968), and justice administration (1969).

As a public state university: 1970–present
Talk of Louisville joining the public university system of Kentucky began in the 1960s. As a municipally-funded school (meaning funding only came from the city of Louisville), the movement of people to the suburbs of Louisville created budget shortfalls for the school and forced tuition prices to levels unaffordable for most students. At the same time, the school's well-established medicine and law schools were seen as potential assets for the state system. Still, there was opposition to the university becoming a state institution, both from faculty and alumni who feared losing the small, close-knit feel of the campus, and from universities already in the state system who feared funding cuts that would be necessitated to accommodate UofL. After several years of heated debate, the university joined the state system in 1970, a move largely orchestrated by then Kentucky governor and UofL alumnus Louie Nunn.

The first years in the state system were difficult, as enrollment skyrocketed while funding was often insufficient. Several programs were threatened with losing accreditation due to a lack of funding, although schools of nursing (1979) and urban & public affairs (1983) were added.

John W. Shumaker was named the university's president in 1995. Shumaker was a very successful fund raiser, and quickly increased the school's endowment from $183 to $550 million. He developed the REACH program to encourage retention. In 1997, he hired athletics director Tom Jurich, who restored the athletics program and raised over $100 million to raze abandoned factories and old parking lots next to campus and replace them with on-campus athletic facilities, which vastly improved the aesthetics of the Belknap Campus. Academically, Louisville moved closer to parity with the state's flagship University of Kentucky as retention rates and research funding increased, and average GPAs and ACT scores were much higher for incoming freshmen.

James R. Ramsey, the university's 17th president, continued the endowment and fundraising growth started by Shumaker. However, Ramsey added more emphasis on improving the physical aspects of the Belknap Campus. To this end, he started a million-dollar "campus beautification project" which painted six overpasses on the Belknap Campus with a University of Louisville theme and planted over 500 trees along campus streets, and doubled the number of on-campus housing units. The university's federal research funding doubled under Ramsey, and three buildings were built for nanotechnology and medical research. The university's graduation rate increased from 30 percent in 1999 to 52 percent in 2012.

On June 17, 2016, Kentucky Governor Matt Bevin announced that the entire board of trustees of the university would be immediately disbanded and replaced, and that Ramsey would be stepping down. This was confirmed in a statement issued by Ramsey on the same day. Ramsey offered his resignation at a board of trustees meeting on July 27, 2016, which was accepted by the board. In December 2016, the university was placed on academic probation by its accrediting agency, the Southern Association of Colleges and Schools, over concerns that Governor Bevin's actions had "violated rules that require that universities be independent". The probation was lifted a year later. The governor's actions were initially blocked by a judge but supported by new legislation passed by the Kentucky legislature in early 2017. In a lawsuit, the university sought $80 million in damages from president Ramsey, but settled only for $800,000 in 2021.

In the summer of 2017, the university again came into the national spotlight as a series of scandals became public. The university's foundation, the organization that manages its endowment and investments, reported "millions of dollars in unbudgeted spending, unapproved activities and endowment losses" in an audit. The National Collegiate Athletic Association (NCAA) suspended the head coach of the men's basketball team, Rick Pitino, for five games after an investigation revealed that a university employee paid escorts to strip and have sex with players and recruits. Shortly after the NCAA announced its findings and penalties, the Federal Bureau of Investigation and the office of the United States Attorney for the Southern District of New York announced the arrest of 10 individuals connected with a "pay for play" scheme connected to sportswear manufacturer Adidas and many institutions, including Louisville. Pitino was subsequently fired.

From 1895 to 2016, the university's Belknap Campus featured a Confederate monument, built before the campus grew to surround the land on which it stood. Commemorating the sacrifices of Confederate veterans who died in the American Civil War, it was erected by the Muldoon Monument Company in 1895 with funds raised by the Kentucky Woman's Confederate Monument Association. Due to controversy in 2016, the statue was moved from its original location to Brandenburg, Kentucky. Relocation started in November and was completed in mid-December.

Neeli Bendapudi became the University of Louisville's 18th president on May 15, 2018.

Campuses

The university has three campuses in the Louisville area, the Belknap, the Health Science, and the Shelby. It also has an International Campus in Panama City, Panama, as well as various satellite facilities in the state of Kentucky and abroad:

Belknap Campus

Acquired in 1923, the Belknap Campus is the school's main campus. It is located three miles (5 km) south of downtown Louisville in the Old Louisville neighborhood. It houses seven of the 12 academic colleges and features one of the casts of Auguste Rodin's The Thinker in front of the main administrative building, Grawemeyer Hall. The grounds of the campus were originally used as an orphanage, with several of the original buildings used.

The Belknap Campus has expanded greatly in recent years, with land housing abandoned factories in the area being purchased and redeveloped. Projects built since 1998 include Cardinal Stadium and adjacent Trager Center fieldhouse, Owsley B. Frazier Cardinal Park (which includes Ulmer Stadium for softball, Trager Stadium for field hockey, Cardinal Track and Soccer Stadium, Bass-Rudd Tennis Center, locker rooms, a playground and a cushioned walking path), Jim Patterson Stadium for baseball, Ralph R. Wright Natatorium, Owsley Brown Frazier Sports medicine Center, and a lacrosse stadium. With new parking at Cardinal Stadium, non-resident parking was moved there and the parking lots near campus were redeveloped with new dormitory buildings, including the Bettie Johnson Apartments, Kurz Hall, Minardi Hall, and Community Park.

Other points of interest on the Belknap Campus include the Rauch Planetarium; the Covi Gallery of the Hite Art Institute, named for the painter Marcia Hite and her husband Allen; and the final resting place for former U.S. Supreme Court Justice Louis D. Brandeis and his wife Alice, under the portico in the Brandeis Law School. Surrounded by, but not part of the campus, is the Speed Art Museum, a private institution that is affiliated with the University of Louisville. The Kentucky State Data center, the state's official clearing house for census data and estimates, is located next to Bettie Johnson Hall.

New student housing has been completed on one of the northwest segments with student parking slated for the other. A new engineering and applied sciences research park is planned for the land south of the Speed School of Engineering. It serves as the centerpiece of a Signature Tax Increment Financing (TIF) district, designed to stimulate economic growth in an area around the university's Belknap campus. The TIF district covers more than 900 acres stretching from Belknap Campus south to the Watterson Expressway. The Kentucky Economic Development Finance Authority recently approved the TIF, paving the way for what could be an estimated $2.6 billion over 30 years.

Belknap Campus development projects

In 2009, the university unveiled its new master plan for the next 20 years with efforts from the University of Louisville Foundation and other affiliate partners. Several important projects under construction or planned at that time included a new student recreation center, soccer stadium, new residence halls and academic buildings. Furthermore, the reconstruction of the I-65 ramps to the Belknap Campus, converting the four lanes of Eastern Parkway into a two-lane road with bike lanes and a landscaped median to improve pedestrian access to the Speed School, the moving of several university offices to allow the existing facilities at Arthur Street and Brandeis Avenue to be converted to commercial property and restaurants. The Yum! Center (a men's basketball and volleyball practice facility) was completed in the fall of 2007. A  Olympic sports training/rehab center adjacent to Trager Stadium is under construction. Trager Plaza, a small plaza with a fountain, statue, and garden has been built with donations by the Trager Family on the south part of campus. The $37.5 million Student Recreation Center, located on the Fourth Street corridor along the western border of campus, opened in October 2013. The Province, The Bellamy and Cardinal Towne are three new student housing developments built to the southwest of campus, near the recreation center. All three were built by private developers, and The Province was built in tandem with Louisville's properties. In the short term, university provost Shirley Willihnganz expects the university to continue partnerships with private entities to build student housing.

Several athletic facilities are being renovated, and the new $8 million academic center will be located beneath the Norton Terrace at the south end of Cardinal Stadium. It will be centrally located between two of the university's cornerstone buildings, the Swain Student Activities Center and Cardinal Stadium. It will have seating capacity for over 5,300 fans and will feature a 15,500 square foot training center that will include identical locker rooms for each team, coaches' offices and a sports medicine training room. This stadium will be the second largest project the athletic department has undertaken behind Cardinal Stadium. Furthermore, a $4 million expansion of Jim Patterson Stadium includes the addition of 1,500 chair back seats, two-tiered ground level terraces, a visiting team locker room, and a 6,400 square foot terrace atop the chair back seats connecting the first and third base sides. The new Jim Patterson Stadium will have a total capacity of 5,000. Along with the $2.75 million expansion of the university's softball stadium will feature a team clubhouse with a locker room, a video room, and a players' lounge. The Dan Ulmer Stadium will see the addition of 200 chair back seats, bringing the seating capacity to 1,000. The project will add a 2,380 square foot fan terrace wrapping around the back of the stadium, as well as a new press box that will more than double its current size.

Health Sciences Campus

The University Health Sciences Center, also called the med campus, is located just east of Downtown Louisville in the Louisville medical park which contains two other major hospitals and several specialty hospitals, and it houses the remaining five colleges. This is the school's original campus, being continuously used since 1846, although none of the original buildings remain. Buildings of note on the HSC include the fourteen story Medical Research Tower and the ten-story University Hospital. Construction is finished for a recently opened, downtown Louisville Cardiovascular Research Innovation Institute building to be directed by a researcher, Stuart Williams from the University of Arizona; and an eight-story, $70 million biomedical research building. Faculty and students also work with neighboring hospitals including Norton Children's Hospital, as well as outreach programs throughout Kentucky, including in Paducah, Campbellsville, and Glasgow.

Health Sciences Campus development projects

The University of Louisville Health Sciences Campus has seen a large amount of new development in the past decade, include the completion of three new buildings: Baxter Research Complex, Cardiovascular Research Tower, and Jackson Street Medical Plaza.

Nucleus, Kentucky's Life Science and Innovation Center, was established in 2008 by the University of Louisville Foundation. Nucleus is assisting in the development of Louisville's Health Science Campus downtown.

Nucleus' work is integral to the development of the research park currently underway at Louisville's Haymarket 30-block property in downtown Louisville. Nucleus Innovation Park will house multiple facilities. The project is expected to cost $300 million and was planned to be constructed from 2009 to 2017. A 200,000-square-foot, eight-story, $18 million building, is the first in a series of structures, broke ground in July 2011, and was expected to open in June 2013.

An important project adjacent to the Downtown Health Sciences Campus was the conversion of the Clarksdale Housing Complex into a new mixed income development called Liberty Green.

Shelby Campus
The  Shelby Campus is located on Shelbyville Road near Hurstbourne Parkway in Eastern Louisville. This campus was originally the home of Kentucky Southern College, a Kentucky Baptist liberal arts college that operated from 1961 to 1969. After the college folded, it transferred all its assets and liabilities to the university. It currently only has three buildings which are used for night classes and seminars, although construction of a $34.6-million Center for Predictive Medicine, a Level 3 biosafety facility, is in the works.

The Shelby Campus is also home to the building which houses the Information Technology Resource Center (ITRC) for homeland security. The ITRC conducts communications and IT research for the U.S. Department of Homeland Security as well as seminars and training in emergency preparedness and response. When completed, the impressive ShelbyHurst Office Campus will have over 1.5 million square feet of modern office space managed, developed and leased by NTS Development Co., in partnership with the University of Louisville Foundation. The first three projects are in full swing.

The Shelby Campus is undergoing a major renovation, with two new entrances to the campus off Hurstbourne Parkway. The overall goal is to develop  of the  campus for business, office, technology and research use, now known as the ShelbyHurst Research and Office Park. The university will spend $7.9 million on the road improvements on the campus. The roadway improvements began in August 2008, with work on a new four-lane boulevard through the campus, bordered by bike lanes and sidewalks, and heavily landscaped. The 600 North Hursbourne – Transformation is evident at the busy northeast corner of ShelbyHurst with the completion of 600 North. The LEED-certified, 125,000-square-foot office building is 80 percent leased and serves as corporate headquarters to Churchill Downs, NTS, Semonin Realtors and Stifel Nicolaus.

International Campus

The University of Louisville runs a sister campus in Panama City, Panama, which has an MBA program. The full-time program takes around 16 months to complete and enrolls about 200 students. It is currently ranked the 4th best MBA program in Latin America.

The university also offers professional MBA programs in Athens, Hong Kong, Singapore and other parts of Asia. Their collaboration partner in Singapore is Aventis School of Management.

Other facilities
Louisville operates the Moore Observatory in Oldham County, an astronomical observatory. There are plans to purchase several hundred acres in Oldham County for the school's equine program.

The president's mansion, Amelia Place, is located at 2515 Longest Avenue. It is the former residence of railroad executive Whitefoord Russell Cole.

Academics
The University of Louisville offers bachelor's degrees in 70 fields of study, master's degrees in 78, and doctorate degrees in 22. According to the National Science Foundation, Louisville spent $176 million on research and development in 2018, ranking it 125th in the nation.

Through its School of Medicine and University Hospital Louisville is known for its innovations in the field of medicine, including world's first self-contained artificial heart transplant (2001), world's first successful hand transplant (1999), development of autotransfusion (1935), and first emergency department (1911).

Rankings

U.S. News & World Report's 2021 edition ranked University of Louisville's undergraduate program tied for 176 among all national universities and tied for 87th among public ones. Forbes Magazine ranks the University 431st among 650 universities, colleges, and service academies; 147th for public colleges, 87th for colleges in the American South and 182nd best U.S. research university in 2019.

Admissions
Admission to Louisville is considered "selective" by U.S. News & World Report. A total of 9,430 applications were received for the freshmen class entering Fall 2015; 6,758 applicants were accepted (71.7%), and 2,797 enrolled. Men constituted 50.9% of the incoming class; women 49.1%.

Among freshman students who enrolled in Fall 2015, SAT scores for the middle 50% ranged from 490 to 620 for critical reading, and from 510 to 620 for math. ACT composite scores for the middle 50% ranged from 22 to 29. The average high school GPA for incoming freshmen was 3.60.

Schools and colleges

The university consists of 12 schools and colleges:
 College of Arts and Sciences (1907)
 College of Business (1953)
 College of Education and Human Development (1968)
 Graduate School (1918)
 J. B. Speed School of Engineering (1925)
 Kent School of Social Work (1936)
 Louis D. Brandeis School of Law (1846)
 School of Dentistry (1887)
 University of Louisville School of Medicine (1837)
 School of Music (1932)
 School of Nursing (1979)
 School of Public Health and Information Sciences (1919–1924; re-established in 2002)

UPS tuition reimbursement and Metropolitan College
In addition to their nationwide partial tuition reimbursement programs, UPS (United Parcel Service) offers Louisville (along with Jefferson Community and Technical College) students who work overnight at Worldport, the company's worldwide air hub at Louisville International Airport, full tuition reimbursement through a program called Metropolitan College. This program offers reimbursement for $65 of book costs for each class, and awards bonus checks to students in good standing at the end of each semester and upon reaching certain credit hour milestones. Employees are eligible for full health insurance coverage. Currently over 75 percent of the workers at the air hub are students.

Honors program
The university's honors program is under the direction of Joy Hart. Incoming freshmen can apply to be in the program if they meet the following requirements: a 3.5 cumulative high school GPA and a 29 on their ACT. Current students can apply for the honors program if they are able to maintain a cumulative GPA of 3.35 or higher. Courses through the program focus on reading, writing and discussion. Students in the honors program benefit from priority registration for classes, smaller class sizes, and unique study abroad opportunities.

Libraries

The University of Louisville library system is a member of the Association of Research Libraries. Louisville's main library branch is the William F. Ekstrom Library, which opened in 1981. It is one of only five universities in the U.S. to have a robotic retrieval system, which robotically places books in humidity-free bins. The University of Louisville libraries were the seventh academic institution in North America to have such a facility.

There are five other libraries at the university, with a combined total of more than 400,000 volumes of work:
 Archives and Special Collections
 The Margaret M. Bridwell Art Library
 Dwight Anderson Memorial Music Library
 Kornhauser Health Sciences Library
 Brandeis Law School Library

In 2009, the Kersey Library at the J. B. Speed School of Engineering was converted to an academic building named the Duthie Center for Engineering. The library's collection was fully integrated into Ekstrom Library on January 15, 2007.

Enrollment statistics

Undergraduate student body
 Total enrollment is 22,293 as of Fall 2012.
 76.2% of students are Kentucky residents.
 44.0% of students are from Jefferson County (down from 64% in 1995)
 Average ACT score: 25.2 as of Fall 2013 (up from 20.7 in 1995)
 6-year graduation rate: 53.5% (2012) (up from 33% in 2004)

Student life

Residence halls

The university has 12 housing options on its campuses:
 Belknap Village North
 Belknap Village South
 Bettie Johnson Hall
 Billy Minardi Hall
 Cardinal Towne – It has an assortment of restaurants on the 1st floor.
 Community Park
 Denny Crum Hall – Named after Denny Crum former basketball coach from 1971 to 2001.
 Herman & Heddy Kurz Hall
 Louisville Hall
 Unitas Tower – Named after footballer Johnny Unitas who attended the school from 1950 to 1954, the tower is easily visible from many parts of campus and is located by the School of Music.
 University Pointe
 University Tower Apartments

Media
The university's student maintained online radio station, WLCV, was shut down at the beginning of the fall 2012 semester due to lack of funding. Louisville holds a prominent role in the city of Louisville's "Public Radio Partnership" which features three NPR stations under one roof, including the school's namesake WUOL-FM which broadcasts classical music. The school also holds one-third of the seats on the Partnership's board of directors.

There is also an independent student-run weekly newspaper, The Louisville Cardinal. The newspaper was founded in 1926, and has maintained financial and editorial independence since 1980. The newspaper is overseen by a board of local media professionals and run by a student editor-in-chief.

Inside the university's Student Activities Center is the Floyd Theatre, a 228-seat movie theater operated by the Student Activities Board. It is capable of running both 35 mm prints and DVD projection.

Greek life
Approximately 18% of undergraduate men and 14% of undergraduate women are active in UL's Greek system.

Sororities
 Alpha Kappa Alpha Chapter Beta Epsilon
 Alpha Omicron Pi 1983 Chapter Pi Alpha
 Alpha Sigma Kappa 2000 Chapter Gamma
 Chi Omega 1929 Chapter Beta Gamma
 Delta Phi Epsilon 1927 (closed since 1951)
 Delta Sigma Theta 1922 Chapter Xi
 Delta Zeta 1928 Chapter Beta Gamma
 Kappa Alpha Theta 2014 Chapter Theta Kappa
 Kappa Delta 1928 Chapter Alpha Xi
 Pi Beta Phi 1925 Chapter Kentucky Alpha
 Sigma Kappa 1922 Chapter Alpha Theta
 Sigma Gamma Rho Chapter Eta Omega
 Zeta Phi Beta Chapter Delta Theta
 Phi Sigma Rho Chapter Alpha Gamma
 Zeta Tau Alpha 1927 (closed since 1977, reopened in 2011)

Fraternities
 Alpha Phi Omega 1946 Chapter Delta Theta
 Alpha Tau Omega Colonized February 2011, Kappa Omicron Chapter founded 2014
 Beta Beta Beta 2019 Chapter Mu Kappa Chi
 Beta Theta Pi 1971 Chapter Delta Pi
 Delta Tau Delta Colonized February 2014
 Delta Upsilon 1921 Chapter Sigma Chi Sigma
 Iota Phi Theta 2001 Chapter Epsilon Iota
 Kappa Alpha Psi 1933 Chapter Alpha Omicron
 Kappa Sigma 1983 Chapter Mu Eta
 Lambda Chi Alpha 1948 Chapter Zeta Sigma Zeta
 Omega Psi Phi 1976 Chapter Phi Eta
 Pi Kappa Alpha 1993 Chapter Kappa Zeta
 Pi Kappa Phi 1949 Chapter Beta Gamma 
 Phi Delta Epsilon 2003 Chapter Kentucky Beta
 Phi Delta Theta 2007 Chapter Kentucky Iota
 Phi Mu Alpha Sinfonia 1995 Chapter Zeta Kappa
 Phi Kappa Tau 1947 Chapter Beta Beta
 Sigma Alpha Epsilon 1999 Chapter Kentucky Sigma
 Sigma Chi 1989 Chapter Iota Lambda
 Sigma Pi 2012 Chapter Iota Omicron
 Sigma Phi Epsilon 1947 Chapter Kentucky Beta
 Tau Kappa Epsilon 1942 Chapter Alpha Chi
 Triangle 1941 Chapter Louisville

Notable people

Alumni

The university has more than 144,000 alumni residing in the United States and around the world.

The university claims as alumni a winner of the Pulitzer Prize for Theatre (Marsha Norman, BFA 1969), a 10-time NFL pro-bowler (Johnny Unitas), the 2016 Heisman Trophy winner (Lamar Jackson), the Minority Leader of the United States Senate (Mitch McConnell, BA 1964), the first female director of the CIA (Gina Haspel, BA 1978), the former Chancellor of the University of California, Berkeley (Chang-Lin Tien, MEng 1983) and many others including governors, senators, mayors, US Attorneys and CEOs.

Athletics

The Louisville (UofL) athletic teams are called the Cardinals. The university is a member of the NCAA Division I ranks, primarily competing in the Atlantic Coast Conference (ACC) since the 2014–15 academic year. The Cardinals previously competed in the American Athletic Conference (The American; formerly known as the original Big East Conference until after the 2012–13 school year) from 2005–06 to 2013–14, and in Conference USA (C-USA) from 1995–96 to 2004–05.

UofL competes in 21 intercollegiate varsity sports. Men's sports include baseball, basketball, cross country, football, golf, soccer, swimming & diving, tennis and track & field; women's sports include basketball, cross country, field hockey, golf, lacrosse, rowing, soccer, softball, swimming & diving, tennis, track & field and volleyball.

Overview

The Cardinals (commonly referred to as "the Cards") are the student athletes representing the university. There are 12 women's and 9 men's teams, all of which participate in the Atlantic Coast Conference. Louisville was invited to the ACC on November 28, 2012, and began play in 2014. The Cardinals are well known nationally in men's basketball with two national championships (2013 vacated) and 9 Final Four appearances (2013 vacated), ranking 5th in NCAA Tournament wins, 9th in winning percentage, and from 2nd to 5th in annual attendance every year since 1984. For the 2015–16 season, the men's basketball team held a self-imposed postseason ban due to a sex scandal involving recruits and former players. The NCAA put the Louisville men's basketball program on four years probation in June 2017 and imposed a number of penalties including a suspension of head coach Rick Pitino, a reduction of scholarships and 123 vacated games as a result of its investigation into the program's stripper scandal.

In recent years other Cardinal teams have gained national prominence. The women's basketball team, coached by Jeff Walz and led by first team All-American Shoni Schimmel, has been to two straight Sweet 16s and have been ranked in the top 10. In December 2008 the Cardinals broke the Big East paid attendance record when 17,000 fans filled Freedom Hall to watch the Cards defeat rival Kentucky, and later that season advanced to the NCAA championship game, losing to Connecticut. The Cardinals returned to the NCAA final behind Native American star Shoni Schimmel in 2013, losing again to Connecticut, The following season, the Cardinals filled the KFC Yum! Center with over 22,000 fans, including an estimated 1,500 Native Americans from 40 states, for the final scheduled home game of the graduating Schimmel. Other Louisville teams with recent post season success includes track and field (two individual national championships), volleyball (consecutive Sweet 16 appearances and a three-peat as Big East Tournament Champions from 2008 to 2010, and Atlantic Coast Conference Champions in 2015) and baseball (two College World Series appearances and consecutive Big East conference titles). The volleyball team has also accomplished achievements such as Head Coach Anne Kordes being named Coach of the Year in 2015, Senior Setter for Louisville, Katie George being named Atlantic Coast Conference Player of the Year, and Freshman Libero, Molly Sauer being named Freshman of the Year and Defensive Player of the Year.

All Louisville locally broadcast games airing on the school's flagship affiliate WHAS-TV Louisville are televised on every cable provider in Kentucky.

See also
 McConnell Center
 Metro-College

Notes

References

External links

 
 Official athletics website

 
Universities and colleges in Louisville, Kentucky
Louisville University
Universities and colleges accredited by the Southern Association of Colleges and Schools
African-American history in Louisville, Kentucky
Louisville University
1798 establishments in Kentucky
Public universities and colleges in Kentucky